Fitton is a surname of English origin. Notable people with the surname include:

 Alexander Fitton (Baron Fitton of Gawsworth) (16301698), Irish barrister and judge
 Andrew Fitton (active from 2007), British businessman and football club owner
 Arthur Fitton (190284), English footballer and cricketer
 Benjamin Fitton (active from 2006), British singer songwriter
 Michael Fitton (born 1980), Irish film & TV Special Effects
 Darrell Fitton (active from 1994), English electronic musician
 Darryl Fitton (born 1962), English professional darts player
 Dexter Fitton (born 1965), English cricketer
 Doris Fitton (18971985), Australian actress and theatrical director
 Edward Fitton the elder (152779), Irish provincial governor
 Edward Fitton, the younger (15481606), English Member of Parliament and administrator in Ireland
 Fitton baronets, a title in the Baronetage of England 161743
 Sir Edward Fitton, 1st Baronet (15721619)
 Sir Edward Fitton, 2nd Baronet (160343)
 Fred Fitton (19051965), English footballer
 Hedley Fitton (18591929), British engraver and printmaker
 James Fitton (priest) (180581), American Catholic missionary
 James Fitton (artist) (18991982), English painter
 Laura Fitton (active from 2010), American businesswoman
 Lesley Fitton, British archaeologist and Keeper of the Department of Greece and Rome, the British Museum
 Margaret Fitton (19021988), British artist 
 Mary Fitton (15781647), English gentlewoman, maid of honour to Queen Elizabeth I
 Michael Fitton (17661852), British naval officer
 Robin Fitton (192870), former Grand Prix motorcycle road racer
 Sarah Mary Fitton (17961874), Irish writer who had an interest in botany 
 Tom Fitton (active from 1998), American activist, president of Judicial Watch
 William Henry Fitton (17801861), Irish physician and amateur geologist

People with the personal name Fitton include:
 Fitton Gerard, 3rd Earl of Macclesfield (16631702), British peer

See also
 Field v Fitton, a New Zealand lawsuit of 1988 regarding privity of contract
 Fitton, a fictional airport in the BBC radio series Cabin Pressure
 Fitton End, a hamlet in the vicinity of Gorefield, Cambridgeshire, England
 Fitton Field, a sports stadium in Worcester, Massachusetts, USA
 Fitton Hill, a large housing estate in Oldham in Greater Manchester, England
 Fitton Rock, a sea-rock near Adelaide Island in Antarctica

References